2 Stupid Dogs is an American animated television series created by Donovan Cook and produced by Hanna-Barbera Cartoons and Turner Program Services for TBS. The series follows the antics of a large Old English Sheepdog, dubbed "Big Dog" (voiced by Brad Garrett) and a smaller Dachshund (voiced by Mark Schiff) nicknamed "Little Dog", who get into various mishaps due to their lack of intellect, as implied from the title.

Series overview

Each episode consists of three segments, with two 2 Stupid Dogs shorts bookending a Super Secret Secret Squirrel short. Cumulatively, each episode is approximately 22 minutes in length, which amounts to roughly seven minutes per segment.

The series premiered on September 5, 1993 with the episode "Door Jam / Goldflipper / Where's the Bone". The first season concluded with the season finale "Cat! / Voo Doo Goat / Love Doctors" on November 28, 1993. The second and final season was broadcast with only one new segment per episode, paired with a Super Secret Secret Squirrel segment and another 2 Stupid Dogs segment, both from the first season. The second season premiered one year after the start of the first, on September 5, 1994 with a new short "Jerk". It concluded with the series finale "Hobo Hounds" on February 13, 1995.

Episodes

Season 1 (1993)
Note: All episodes in this season were directed by Donovan Cook.

Season 2 (1994–95)

References
 General

External links
  (episode guide)

2 Stupid Dogs